Somprasong Nilsamai is a Thai naval officer. From 1 October 2021 to 30 September 2022, he served as commander-in-chief of the Royal Thai Navy. Choengchai Chomchoengpaet was appointed as his successor.

References 

Living people
Place of birth missing (living people)
Somprasong Nilsamai
1962 births
Somprasong Nilsamai